Aylestone School is a co-educational secondary school in Herefordshire, England. The school has an enrolment of 419, and caters for the Key Stage 3 and Key Stage 4 education of students aged 11–16.

History
The school was established as the comprehensive Aylestone School following the merger of Hereford High School for Girls and Hereford High School for Boys in 1976. The school was known as Aylestone High School before it was renamed Aylestone Business and Enterprise College in the 2000s following the introduction of Business and Enterprise Colleges as part of the specialist schools programme. In 2017, the school's name reverted to Aylestone School.

The school's administration building is Broadlands House, a 19th-century Grade II listed building.

Governance 
Along with Broadlands Primary School and Withington Primary School, Aylestone School forms a federation with a single governing body. The school is led by an executive headteacher, Simon Robertson, and a team of twelve governors. A student council consists of a representative from each tutor group.

School structure

Admissions 
The school has an enrolment of 419 students. It is co-educational; approximately 53% of students are female and 47% male. Entrance is non-selective. The school's catchment area lies primarily to the north of Hereford in the Lugg valley, and covers the outlying settlements of Wellington to the north west, Withington to the east, and Hereford city centre to the south.

Academic 
The Key Stage 3 (KS3) curriculum includes English, Mathematics, Science, Humanities (History, Geography, Religious Education, and Empowerment), Modern Foreign Languages (MFL), Art and Design, Computing, Music, Physical Education, and Design and Technology. At Key Stage 4 (KS4), the curriculum is widened to cover the mandatory subjects of both English Language and English Literature, the specific science disciplines of Biology, Chemistry, and Physics, and Issues and Ethics subjects including PSHE, Sex Education, Citizenship and Careers. Optional courses introduced at KS4 include Business Studies, specific technology disciplines such as Food Technology and Resistant Materials, Psychology, as well as BTEC qualifications in Music and Sport and Leisure.

During the 2019–2020 academic year, the school employed 59 full- and part-time staff, including 33 teachers, 13 teaching assistants, and 13 members of non-classroom support staff. The pupil–teacher ratio at this time was 12.8:1.

Attainment 
The school's 2016 and 2018 Ofsted inspections showed that it "requires improvement". Monitoring inspections in 2019 and 2021 found that the senior leaders and governors were taking "effective action" for improvement. The school's Progress 8 benchmark score is deemed to be "well below average" and is in the lowest 12% of schools in England. The school's Attainment 8 and EBacc scores are also below the national average. At GCSE level, 16% of student attain Grade 5 or above compared to the national average of 43%. In previous Ofsted inspections, the school was described as "good" or "satisfactory".

Pastoral 
The school uses a house system, comprising four houses:
 Mortimer
 Clare
 Delacy
 Coningsby
The houses compete in events throughout the academic year, including cookery, poetry, and language competitions, as well as sports day.

Notable alumni 
 Paul Keetch, Liberal Democrat Member of Parliament for Hereford (1997–2010)
 Susan Powell, broadcast meteorologist (BBC Weather)
 Jo Stone-Fewings, actor (Royal Shakespeare Company)
 Josh McNally, rugby union player (England, Bath)

Former headteachers and notable staff 
At least five people have held the post of headteacher since the school's establishment in 1976. Deputy headteachers have assumed the role of interim headteacher when the role has been vacant.
Bob Howe
Tony Wray (1989–2003)
Steve Byatt (2004–2007)
Sue Woodrow (2008–2015)

For a time in the 1970s, the school employed conman and bigamist Robert Peters as its head of Religious Education. Peters, who used his birthname (Robert Parkins) to take the role, formed a relationship with the Head of the Lower School and they married. Peters left the school when his falsified qualifications were discovered.

Footnotes

References

External links
 

Secondary schools in Herefordshire
1976 establishments in England
Educational institutions established in 1976
Schools in Hereford
Community schools in Herefordshire